La Neuville-aux-Bois is a commune in the Marne department, Grand Est region, northeastern France.

See also
Communes of the Marne department

References

Neuvilleauxbois